FlexiLivre is a French Internet-based photo album company founded in 2013 by Mathieu Clouté and Kamel Boughaleb.

Awards and accolades 
In 2020, FlexiLivre was ranked 778th among the 1,000 fastest-growing companies in Europe by the Financial Times.

The same year, FlexiLivre was ranked as the 134th fastest-growing French company by Les Echos.

References 

 Sources

 
 
 

Photo software